Dionysis Makris (Greek: Διονύσης Μακρής) born 5 February 1982 as Dionysis Sindrivanis) is a popular Greek singer, of laiko music.

Biography
Makris was born on 5 February 1982 in Thessaloniki and appeared on the Greek talent show Dreamshow.

In 2006, he released his first album titled Apolafsi. The lead single "Apolafsi" with its line "Itan I Zoi Mou Kolasi" (Was My Life Hell) charted well and became a dance floor hit. He also performed a duet with Kelly Kelekidou titled "Glyka Mou Kai Apolafsi Mou".

In 2007, he was a candidate to receive an "Arion Music Award", losing to Tamta.

In January 2008, Makris' new CD single "Mou Eipes Psemata was released and in the upcoming months, he will star in a new Greek television series.

Discography

Studio albums

All the albums listed below were released in Greece.

CD Singles

References

1982 births
Living people
Greek laïko singers
21st-century Greek male singers
Musicians from Thessaloniki
Sony Music Greece artists